Turnquest is a surname. Notable people with the surname include:

K. Peter Turnquest (born 1964), Bahamian politician
O. Tommy Turnquest (born 1959), Bahamian politician
Orville Turnquest (born 1929), Bahamian politician, father of O. Tommy